John Nathan "Janno" Lieber (born September 19, 1961) is the head of the Metropolitan Transportation Authority (MTA) in New York. He was appointed acting chair and CEO in July 2021 and confirmed permanently in January 2022.

Early life and career 
Lieber was born on September 19, 1961, to Charles and Mimi Levin Lieber. Charles was a president of the Hebrew Publishing Company and Mimi was a member of the New York State Board of Regents.

In the 1980s, Lieber was a journalist at The New Republic.

He worked as a transportation policy advisor during New York City Mayor Ed Koch's administration. Later Lieber served as an acting assistant secretary in the U.S. Department of Transportation during the Clinton administration.

In 2003, he joined Silverstein Properties, where he would later become the president of their World Trade Center Properties division, leading the rebuilding after the September 11 attacks. In a 2015 interview with The New York Times, he described himself as "a jack-of-all-trades," saying, "I do everything from financing to the legal to the design and construction to the P.R. and government relations."

Metropolitan Transportation Authority 
In 2017, then-governor Andrew Cuomo appointed Lieber to be the MTA's chief development officer. In this role of chief development officer, Liever oversaw a range of capital initiatives including the long-delayed completion of the extension of the Second Avenue Subway line on the East Side of Manhattan.

In July 2021, Cuomo nominated Lieber to serve as acting chair and CEO, following the retirement of Pat Foye. In November 2021, governor Kathy Hochul said she wanted to nominate him for those roles permanently. He was formally nominated by Hochul and subsequently confirmed by the New York State Senate in January 2022.

On January 25, 2023, Lieber rode with Hochul on the first train to the new Grand Central Madison station, part of the East Side Access project.

References 

Executives of Metropolitan Transportation Authority (New York)
Collegiate School (New York) alumni
1960s births
Living people

Year of birth uncertain
American people of Jewish descent
Harvard College alumni
New York University School of Law alumni